Zdeněk Hoření (9 February 1930 – 12 February 2021) was a Czechoslovak journalist who served as Editor-in-Chief of Rudé právo, the official newspaper of the Communist Party of Czechoslovakia.

Biography
Hoření began working for Rudé právo in 1954 as an editor and served as its Moscow correspondent from 1962 to 1968. In 1969, he became Deputy Editor-in-Chief of the party magazine Tribuna, and subsequently held the same role for Rudé právo. From 1983 until the end of the Velvet Revolution, he held the position of Editor-in-Chief. He had also served as President of the Czechoslovak Union of Journalists.

From October 1984 to November 1989, he was a member of the secretariat of the Central Committee.

During the 1976 Czech legislative election, he was elected to the Czech National Council. He was re-elected in 1981. For the 1986 Czechoslovak parliamentary election, he moved to the Federal Assembly of Czechoslovakia, winning his bid to represent Constituency No. 64, which contained the cities of Most and Chomutov. He served until his resignation in January 1990 after the Velvet Revolution removed the Communist Party from power.

Following the Velvet Revolution, Hoření withdrew himself from public life. He worked in the editorial office of the communist newspaper Haló noviny, where his daughter, Monika, now works.

Zdeněk Hoření died of COVID-19 during the COVID-19 pandemic in the Czech Republic in Prague on 12 February 2021, at the age of 91, three days after his birthday.

References

1930 births
2021 deaths
Czechoslovak journalists
Members of the Federal Assembly of Czechoslovakia (1986–1990)
Communist Party of Czechoslovakia politicians
People from Jablonec nad Nisou District
Deaths from the COVID-19 pandemic in the Czech Republic
Czech editors
Czech magazine editors
Members of the Czech National Council
Members of the Central Committee of the Communist Party of Czechoslovakia